Uterine clear-cell carcinoma (CC) is a rare form of endometrial cancer with distinct morphological features on pathology; it is aggressive and has high recurrence rate. Like uterine papillary serous carcinoma  CC does not develop from endometrial hyperplasia  and is not hormone sensitive, rather it arises from an atrophic endometrium. Such lesions belong to the type II endometrial cancers.

Diagnosis
The lesion is found in patients who present typically with abnormal or postmenopausal bleeding or discharge. Such bleeding is followed by further evaluation leading to a tissue diagnosis, usually done by a dilatation and curettage (D&C). A work-up to follow would look for metastasis using imaging technology including sonography and MRI. The median age at diagnosis in a large study was 66 years. Histologically the lesion may coexist with classical endometrial cancer.

Treatment
Prognosis of  the CC  is affected by age, stage, and histology as well as treatment

The primary treatment is surgical. FIGO-cancer staging is done at the time of surgery which consists of peritoneal cytology, total hysterectomy, bilateral salpingo-oophorectomy, pelvic/para-aortic lymphadenectomy, and omentectomy.  The tumor is aggressive and spreads quickly into the myometrium and the lymphatic system. Thus even in presumed early stages, lymphadenectomy and omentectomy should be included in the surgical approach. If the tumor has spread surgery is cytoreductive followed by radiation therapy and/or chemotherapy.

The five years survival was reported to be 68%.

Staging
Uterine clear-cell carcinoma is staged like other forms of endometrial carcinoma at time of surgery using the International Federation of Gynecology and Obstetrics (FIGO) cancer staging system 2009.

IA       Tumor confined to the uterus, no or <  myometrial invasion

IB       Tumor confined to the uterus, >  myometrial invasion

II       Cervical stromal invasion, but not beyond uterus

IIIA     Tumor invades serosa or adnexa
  
IIIB     Vaginal and/or parametrial involvement

IIIC1    Pelvic node involvement

IIIC2    Para-aortic involvement

IVA      Tumor invasion bladder and/or bowel mucosa

IVB      Distant metastases including abdominal metastases and/or inguinal lymph nodes

References

External links 

Gynaecological cancer